Kheyrabad-e Pain ( is a village in Hamedanak Rural District of Bostan District of Baharestan County, Tehran province, Iran. The latest census in 2016 showed a population of 417 people in 121 households. It is the smallest of the three villages in its rural district.

References 

Baharestan County

Populated places in Tehran Province

Populated places in Baharestan County

fa:خیرآباد پایین (بهارستان)